Nanheng station, is a station of Line 4 of the Guangzhou Metro. It started operations on 28 December 2017, and is the southernmost station in the entire Guangzhou Metro system.

Station layout

Exits

References

Railway stations in China opened in 2017
Guangzhou Metro stations in Nansha District